Perunna aka Perunnai is a suburb of Changanassery town in Kottayam District, Kerala, India. The nearest big city, Kottayam, is 21 km away from Perunna. 
Perunna is also located at the intersection of MC Road (SH1) and Alappuzha-Changanassery Highway (SH11, aka AC Road). 
It is well known within Kerala as the headquarters of the Nair Service Society (NSS), a Nair community organization and as the birthplace of the famous 20th century social reformer and freedom fighter Mannathu Padmanabhan, founder of NSS. It is also the birthplace of poet Ulloor S. Parameswara Iyer.

Major Attractions and Places of Interest 
 Headquarters of Nair Service Society (NSS), a Nair community organization
 NSS Hindu College
 NSS Medical Mission Hospital
 Mannam Library
 Perunna Subrahmanya Swami temple, a well-known Hindu temple of Kerala, also reputed for historical significance with regard to the famous Temple Entry Proclamation by the Maharajah of Travancore.
 Sree Sankara Community for Ayurveda Consciousness Limited an Ayurveda hospital group 
 Amba Ayurveda Vaidyasala

See also 
 Vaikom Satyagraha

References 

Villages in Kottayam district
Changanassery